is an anime series aired for 52 episodes on TV Osaka from October 7, 1983 through March 30, 1984. A second series with the same title was aired from October 9, 1984 through April 9, 1985. Prior to the TV series, an anime film was released on December 26, 1981. They were produced as a Chinese-Japanese-German venture and directed by Shuichi Nakahara and Tatsuo Shimamura.

The series is about the eponymous Taotao, a small panda. In the stories, Taotao has adventures with his animal friends and listens to the stories of his mother, the mother panda.

The theme music of the series was composed by the Czech Karel Svoboda.

International broadcast

The series has been shown in Finnish on the Yleisradio channels. The series was narrated in Finnish by Inkeri Wallenius over the German soundtrack of the Austrian ORF television channel.

The series was also broadcast in Israel where it was dubbed into Hebrew and its theme was sung in Hebrew by the singer Ilanit.

In Greece, the series was broadcast in the 1980s on the TV channel ET1 in Greek.

In the late 1980s it was broadcast in Afrikaans in South Africa. The anime was also broadcast in the early 1990s multiple times as تاو' تاو' and is still popular in the Arab world.

The series was also broadcast in Albania in the late 1980s and early 1990s. Meanwhile, Albania's communist prime minister Adil Çarçani was informally referred to as Tao Tao by the Albanian dissidents during the protests leading to the fall of communism in Albania.

The series has been shown in French in French Canada on Télévision de Radio-Canada and in France from 1987 on FR3. 

During 1992, with the collaboration of CFI from France, Vietnam Television dubbed the series to Vietnamese for their children program "Những bông hoa nhỏ".

DVDs
Taotao 1-4
Story about a crow who wanted to look like a woodpecker
Story about a rabbit who beat a lion
Story about a self-righteous snake
Story about three puffy frog sisters
Taotao 5-8
Story about the crocodile king and his sick wife
Story about a rabbit who started a big rumour
Story about a white camel
Story about a careful bat
Taotao 9-12
Story about a vain vulture
Story about the moving day of the birds
Story about the adventure of the small fish
Story about the wedding party of the fairies
Taotao 13-16
Story about unusual friends
Story about the difficult problem that troubled the mouse
Story about the selfish weather vane
Story about the discontent butterfly
Taotao 17-21
Story about three little pigs
Story about a zebra
Story about a rainbow bird
Story about a small dog and a big bone
Story about a babbling turtle
Taotao 22-26
Story about an ugly duckling
Story about an owl and the north wind
Story about the cat in boots
Story about the gift of a fish
Story about the missing fairies

In popular culture

The Finnish band Guava published the Taotao theme music as a single in 2003.

References

External links
 https://web.archive.org/web/20080331060753/http://www.yle.fi/lapset/taotao/
 Guava's single
 

1981 anime films
1983 anime television series debuts
1984 anime television series debuts
1985 Japanese television series endings
Japanese animated films
Films about giant pandas
Television series about pandas